Simone Barlaam (born 12 July 2000) is an Italian Paralympic swimmer who competes in international level events. He is a thirteen time World champion and eight time European champion. He competed at the 2020 Summer Paralympics, winning a gold medal.

Personal life
Barlaam was born with a coxa vara and congenital hypoplasia in his right femur which means that his right leg doesn't develop resulting in his right leg shorter than his left leg. This was caused by doctors who performed a podalic version procedure while he was in utero but his leg broke which doctors knew nothing about. During his childhood, he went through thirteen surgeries to correct his right leg.

Swimming career
Barlaam began Paralympic swimming when he was fifteen years old and won his first medals at the 2017 World Para Swimming Championships in Mexico City. He swims and trains with other able-bodied swimmers.

References

External links
 
Para Swimmer Simone Barlaam dreams of designing prosthetics Olympics.com

2000 births
Living people
Swimmers from Milan
Paralympic swimmers of Italy
Medalists at the World Para Swimming Championships
Medalists at the World Para Swimming European Championships
Italian people of American descent
Swimmers at the 2020 Summer Paralympics
Paralympic gold medalists for Italy
Paralympic silver medalists for Italy
Medalists at the 2020 Summer Paralympics
Paralympic medalists in swimming
Italian male freestyle swimmers
Italian male backstroke swimmers
Italian male butterfly swimmers
S9-classified Paralympic swimmers
21st-century Italian people